KF Nerashti is a football club based in the village of Vratnica,  Jegunovce Municipality, North Macedonia. They are currently competing in the Macedonian Third League (West Division).

References

External links
Club info at MacedonianFootball 

Nerashti
Nerashti